Events from the year 1916 in Canada.

Incumbents

Crown 
 Monarch – George V

Federal government 
 Governor General – Duke of Connaught and Strathearn (until November 11) then Victor Cavendish, 9th Duke of Devonshire 
 Prime Minister – Robert Borden
 Chief Justice – Charles Fitzpatrick (Quebec) 
 Parliament – 12th

Provincial governments

Lieutenant governors 
Lieutenant Governor of Alberta – Robert Brett 
Lieutenant Governor of British Columbia – Francis Stillman Barnard 
Lieutenant Governor of Manitoba – Douglas Colin Cameron (until August 3) then James Albert Manning Aikins
Lieutenant Governor of New Brunswick – Josiah Wood 
Lieutenant Governor of Nova Scotia – David MacKeen (until November 13) then MacCallum Grant (from November 29)
Lieutenant Governor of Ontario – John Strathearn Hendrie 
Lieutenant Governor of Prince Edward Island – Augustine Colin Macdonald 
Lieutenant Governor of Quebec – Pierre-Évariste Leblanc 
Lieutenant Governor of Saskatchewan – Richard Stuart Lake

Premiers 
Premier of Alberta – Arthur Sifton
Premier of British Columbia – William John Bowser (until November 23) then Harlan Brewster
Premier of Manitoba – Tobias Norris  
Premier of New Brunswick – George Johnson Clarke 
Premier of Nova Scotia – George Henry Murray 
Premier of Ontario – William Hearst
Premier of Prince Edward Island – John Mathieson  
Premier of Quebec – Lomer Gouin  
Premier of Saskatchewan – Thomas Walter Scott (until October 20) then William Melville Martin

Territorial governments

Commissioners 
 Commissioner of Yukon – George Black (until October 13) then George Norris Williams (acting)
 Gold Commissioner of Yukon – George P. MacKenzie 
 Commissioner of Northwest Territories – Frederick D. White

Events

January to June
January 28 – Women are given the right to vote in Manitoba, after protests by people such as Nellie McClung
February 3 – The Centre Block of the Parliament Buildings in Ottawa burns down
February 10 – An anti-German riot hits Calgary
March 14 – Saskatchewan women get the vote
April 19 – Alberta women get the vote
June – Rodeo's first side-delivery chute is designed and made by the Bascom brothers on their Bar-B-3 Ranch at Welling, Alberta. 
May 7 – The Government of Canada authorizes the creation of an all black battalion that became No. 2 Construction Battalion, Canadian Expeditionary Force.
June 1 – June 13 – WWI: Canadians fight in the Battle of Mont Sorrel

July to December
July 1 – Prohibition of alcohol introduced in Alberta
July 1 – November 18 25,000 Canadians and Newfoundlanders are casualties at the Battle of the Somme
July 24 – Earl Bascom enters his first steer riding contest at Welling, Alberta.
July 29 – The Matheson Fire in the region northwest of North Bay, Ontario, begins. It eventually kills between 200 and 250 people and destroys six towns, including Matheson and Cochrane
August 11 – The 4th Canadian Division arrives in France
October 20 – William M. Martin becomes premier of Saskatchewan, replacing Walter Scott
November 23 – Harlan Brewster becomes premier of British Columbia, replacing William John Bowser
December 1 – An Order in Council authorizes an increase of troops to 500,000 in the First World War

Full date unknown
Victor Cavendish, 9th Duke of Devonshire becomes Governor General of Canada replacing Prince Arthur, Duke of Connaught
The National Research Council of Canada is established.
The first Doukhobors arrive in Alberta
Emily Murphy became the first female magistrate in Canada, and in the British Empire.

Arts and literature

New works
Lucy Maud Montgomery – The Watchman & Other Poems
Max Aitken – Canada in Flanders
Alfred Laliberté – Les petits Baigneurs

Sport
March 30 – The National Hockey Association's  Montreal Canadiens beat the Portland Rosebuds of the Pacific Coast Hockey Association 3 games to 2  to win their first Stanley Cup. All Games were played at the Montreal Arena

Births

January to June
January 22 – Bill Durnan, ice hockey player (d.1972)
February 4 – Pudlo Pudlat, artist (d.1992)

February 10 – Claude Bissell, author and educator (d.2000)
February 18 – Jean Drapeau, lawyer, politician and Mayor of Montreal (d.1999)
February 23 – Molly Kool, North America's first registered female sea captain (d.2009)
March 10 – Davie Fulton, politician and judge (d.2000)
April 18 – Ian Wahn, politician and lawyer (d.1999)
April 27 – Myfanwy Pavelic, artist (d.2007)
May 3 – Léopold Simoneau, lyric tenor (d.2006)
May 4 – Jane Jacobs, urbanist, writer and activist (d.2006)
May 30 – Jack Dennett, radio and television announcer (d.1975)
June 20 – Jean-Jacques Bertrand, politician and 21st Premier of Quebec (d.1973)

July to December
July 16 – John Gallagher, geologist and businessman (d.1998)

July 21 – Wilfred Cantwell Smith, professor of comparative religion (d.2000)
August 1 – Anne Hébert, author and poet (d.2000)
September 5 – Frank Shuster, comedian (d.2002)
September 18 – Laura Sabia, social activist and feminist (d.1996)
October 9 – Bill Allum, ice hockey player (d.1992)
October 30 – Roy Brown Jr., car design engineer (Edsel, Ford Consul, Ford Cortina) (d.2013)
November 17 – , businessman (d.2013)
November 23 – P. K. Page, poet (d.2010)
December 5 – Lomer Brisson, politician and lawyer (d.1981)
December 7 – Margaret Carse, dancer
December 16 – Harry Gunning, scientist and administrator (d.2002)
December 20 – Michel Chartrand, activist (d.2010)
December 23 – Ruth Dawson, artist

Full date unknown
John Wintermeyer, politician (d.1994)

Deaths
February 3 – Bowman Brown Law, politician (b.1855)
May 12 – Joseph-Aldric Ouimet, politician (b.1848)
May 29 – Louis-Alphonse Boyer, politician (b.1839)
June 27 – Daniel Webster Marsh, businessman and Mayor of Calgary (b.1838)
July 28 – Pierre-Amand Landry, lawyer, judge and politician (b.1846)
August 8 – Edgar Dewdney, politician, Lieutenant Governor of Northwest Territories and Lieutenant Governor of British Columbia (b.1835)
December 12 – Albert Lacombe, missionary (b.1827)

Full date unknown
Grace Annie Lockhart, first woman in the British Empire to receive a Bachelor's degree (b.1855)

See also 
 List of Canadian films

Historical documents
"There is a big fire" - Parliamentary officer warns MPs sitting in session to get out as fatal fire begins to destroy Centre Block of Parliament buildings
Prime Minister Borden appeals to Canadians for service abroad and at home.
Prime Minister Borden fires militia minister Lt. Gen. Sam Hughes for insubordination.
Warning to Imperial Munitions Board head about Ross rifle's dangerous failings.
Charles K. Clarke calls for small hospitals to treat veterans with "intense nervous troubles" that are rapidly curable.
Arthur Pearson's letter praising soldier for his rapid progress adjusting to his blindness.
120th City of Hamilton Battalion recruiting advertisement.
Cartoonist imagines soldier's vision of Christmas at home.
Orderly in Canadian hospital brags about its superiority over British facilities, and his bandaging technique.
Canadian nurse in Petrograd's Anglo-Russian Hospital enjoys much local culture.
Canadian nurse serving in French army hospital gives poignant description of soldier's funeral.
Renaming Berlin (Kitchener), Ont.: anti-change ad, and list of suggested new names.
Senator objects to Ontario policy restricting education in French.
Testimony regarding sale of Squamish land in Vancouver area.
Scores killed as huge forest fire destroys northern Ontario towns.
U.S.A. and U.K. sign agreement to conserve North American migratory birds.
Political cartoon warns Western Canadian drinkers that prohibition is coming in 1916.

References

External links

 
Years of the 20th century in Canada
Canada
Canada